The Cabinet of Caligari is a 1962 American horror film by Roger Kay, starring Glynis Johns, Dan O'Herlihy, and Richard Davalos, and released by 20th Century Fox.

Although the film's title is very similar to the German silent horror film The Cabinet of Dr. Caligari (1920), it shares very few similarities except for the main plot twist. The film's script was written by Robert Bloch, author of the novel Psycho. The cinematographer for The Cabinet of Caligari was John L. Russell, who also worked on Alfred Hitchcock's film Psycho (1960).

Plot
Motorist Jane Lindstrom (Glynis Johns) has a tire blowout and seeks assistance at an estate owned by Caligari (Dan O'Herlihy), a very polite man with an Irish accent. After spending the night there, she finds that Caligari will not let her leave; he proceeds to ask some personal questions and shows her pictures that offend her.

Prevented by guards from leaving and unable to use the telephone, Jane seeks allies among the other guests. She finds only three possible candidates: the older Paul, the younger Mark (Dick Davalos), for whom she has romantic desires, and a lively elderly woman named Ruth (Estelle Winwood). After seeing Ruth tortured, Jane goes to Paul who convinces her to confront Caligari. Jane does so and tries to seduce him, as she suspects he has been spying on her in the bath. After her attempts fail, Caligari reveals that he and Paul are one and the same person, Jane runs down a corridor of wildly shifting imagery that acts as a transition.

Finally, it is revealed that Jane is a mental patient and everything the audience has seen up to this point has been her distortion of the institute she was in: the personal questions were psychoanalysis, the pictures were Rorschach blots, Ruth's torture was shock treatment, and even Caligari's coat of arms was a distorted version of the medical caduceus symbol. Cured, Jane is taken from the asylum by Mark, now revealed to be her son.

Cast
 Glynis Johns as Jane
 Dan O'Herlihy as Paul/Caligari
 Dick Davalos as Mark
 Lawrence Dobkin as David
 Constance Ford as Christine
 Estelle Winwood as Ruth
 J. Pat O'Malley as Perkins

Production

Sam Goldwyn bought the remake rights in 1921. He assigned the project to French-born Roger Kay, who had directed Grand Guignol theatre in Paris and New York. He also had degrees in psychology. The director Roger Kay persuaded Robert Bloch "to drop the Dr from the original title but do a story with enough similarity to be recognizable as an homage." At one stage, the film was just known as Caligari. The story of the way director Roger Kay tried to rob Bloch of the writing credit for the film and how Bloch won is told in Bloch's autobiography.

Robert Lippert's movies around this time normally cost $500,000, but Lippert allowed extra funds for this movie. It was shot over 25 days. Harry Spalding, who worked for Lippert, later recalled that everyone in their organization thought making the film was a bad idea except for Lippert. He says the director hired Robert Bloch to write the script, but they had a falling out and the director wrote the script himself. Bloch's signing was announced in July 1961. Glynis Johns was signed in November. Maury Dexter, head of Lippert's company, says Lippert told him "to give Roger [Kay] a wide berth because he expected great things from him."

Kay used a color chart when making the film. He went through the script and allocated a color representing the emotion the audience was to feel." The new Caligari is completely modern", said Kay during filming. "I don't want to sound presumptuous but I am trying to get the Pirandello approach that says nothing is what it appears to be. The thesis behind the damsel in distress, behind the little thrills and shocks is, What is reality?""This picture is going to cause a lot of talk", said Lippert. Dexter says once he read the script and saw how different the film would be from the original, he advised Lippert to fire Kay, but Lippert backed the director. He also says Kay yelled at Glynis Johns during filming and Johns ran off the set; Lippert forced Kay to apologize so filming could continue.

Reception
Dexter says the film was a critical and financial failure.

In 1963, Kay said he "disowns" the film, blaming Fox for turning it into a "lurid, sex charged picture" and claiming the version released was "considerably different" from his version. He said a copy of his original cut was with the Museum of Modern Art.

Lippert wanted to reunite O'Herily and Johns in an adaptation of Trilby, but no film resulted.

See also
 List of American films of 1962

References

External links
 
 
 
 
 

1962 films
1962 horror films
1960s psychological thriller films
American psychological horror films
British horror films
American black-and-white films
British black-and-white films
20th Century Fox films
CinemaScope films
Films scored by Gerald Fried
Films with screenplays by Robert Bloch
Films set in psychiatric hospitals
1960s English-language films
1960s American films
1960s British films